Desde El Principio is the twelfth studio album by Spanish duo Azúcar Moreno, released on Sony International in 2004.

The album saw the Salazar sisters joining forces with a new production team; drummer and percussionist Sergio Castillo and keyboardist Francisco Amat. Castillo and Amat began their career in music in the early 1980s and had previously produced albums with among others Cuban singer Silvio Rodríguez, Tunisian-French Dany Brillant, and in the late 90s and early 2000s most notably the young Spanish rumba-rock duo Estopa to great success. Productionwise Desde El Principio marked a return to Azúcar Moreno's winning formula of the early 90s in that it mixed mainstream Latin pop with material from a wide variety of genres. Tracks like "Sangre Española", "Me Quedo Contigo" and "Vamos a Dejarlo Así" mainly featured drums, percussion and Spanish guitars, recorded live, while lead single "Mi Ritmo" was a typical Azúcar Moreno dance track with a more synthesized and contemporary urban sound. Just like 1991's Mambo the album also featured flamenco/dance covers of a number of pop classics like "Don't Let Me Be Misunderstood", a hit for both Nina Simone and The Animals in the 60s and also turned into disco classic by Santa Esmeralda in 1977, the Neapolitan traditional "¡Oh Sole Mío!", also covered by Elvis Presley in English as "It's Now Or Never", but, Azúcar Moreno's large LGBT following in both Europe and South America considered, most importantly their take on Gloria Gaynor's 1979 gay anthem "I Will Survive", retitled "Sobreviviré".

Despite this Desde El Principio proved to be a modest commercial success. "Mi Ritmo" was somewhat surprisingly the first Azúcar Moreno lead single since the late 1980s to be issued without any accompanying dance remixes, and the follow-up's "Sobreviviré", "Se Me Va" and "El" were never commercially released, but only as promo singles distributed to radio stations and disc jockeys - again without any remixes; in Spain the album sold some 50.000 copies, making it their first studio album since 1988's Carne De Melocotón not to go platinum or multi-platinum in their home country. 
Desde El Principio also came to be the duo's final album for the Sony Music Entertainment label, a company they after a series of mergers in various forms had been signed to for some fifteen years (CBS Records Spain, Epic Records Spain, CBS-Epic Spain, eventually a sublabel to Sony Music Spain, today a subsidiary to the multinational Sony BMG Music Entertainment conglomerate). In 2006 Azúcar Moreno returned to their previous label EMI Music for the album Bailando Con Lola.

While Sony Music have continued to release hits compilations with Azúcar Moreno all through the 2000s, such as Toda La Pasión De Azúcar Moreno (2001), Colección De Oro (2002), 20 Grandes Exitos (2003), Los Esenciales (2003) and 20 Exitos Originales (2005), as well as numerous mid-price collections, none of these include any new recordings, remixes or tracks not to be found on the duo's ten studio albums for the CBS/Epic/Sony label, several of the duo's greatest hits do however appear in edited form.

Track listing

"Mi Ritmo" (Jimeno, Tena) - 3:30  
"Se Me Va" (Alejandro) - 3:39 
"Mírame y No Me Toques" (Diaz Reguera, Diaz Reguera, Diaz Cura) - 3:32
"Piti Mini" (Granados, Pizarro) - 3:18  
"Nadie Me Comprende Como Tú" ("Don't Let Me Be Misunderstood") (Benjamin, Caldwell, Marcus) - 3:41  
"Tu Marcha" (Ganoza Barrionuevo, Martin Escalón, Ortega Heredia) - 3:19
"Sangre Española" (Tena, Vargas) - 3:38  
"Sobreviviré" ("I Will Survive") (Fekaris, Perren) - 4:03  
"Él" (Sánchez) - 4:30
"Un Poco" (Sanchez) - 4:00  
"Me Quedo Contigo" (with Los Chunguitos, in memory of Enrique) (Ramos Prada, Salazar Salazar) - 3:35
"¡Oh Sole Mío!" (Di Capua, Gapurro, Mazzucchi) - 3:34  
"Vamos a Dejarlo Así" (Acoustic) (Ochaíto, Solano) - 2:16

Personnel
 Azúcar Moreno - lead vocals
 Los Chunguitos - lead vocals "Me Quedo Contigo"
 Tito Dávila - backing vocals 
 Richard Marin - rap, backing vocals, quejio  
 Sergio Castillo - percussion, programming, drums, palmas
 Francisco Amat - piano, keyboards, programming, palmas
 Paco Bastante - bass guitar    
 Merv De Peyer - keyboards  
 Luis Dulzaides - percussion  
 Marcelo Carlos Fuentes - bass guitar  
 Paco Ibanez - trumpet, fliscorno  
 Juan Maya - Spanish guitar  
 John Parsons - acoustic guitar, electric guitar  
 José Antonio Romero - mandolin, electric guitar, lap steel guitar  
 Juan Antonio Salazar - Spanish guitar, jaleos  
 Alan Steinberger - electric guitar 
 Ludovico Vagnone - acoustic guitar, electric guitar, Spanish guitar

Production
 Sergio Castillo - record producer, musical arranger, musical direction, realization
 Francisco Amat - record producer, musical arranger, sound engineer, musical direction, realization
 Francisco Gude - sound engineer, mixing, drum engineering, piano engineering, recording
 Merv De Peyer - musical arranger, mixing   
 Alfredo Bolona Jimenez - sound engineer, production assistant  
 Julian Lowe - mastering  
 Kepa Madrazo - production assistant
 Carlos Martin - graphic design, art direction
 Manu Araujo - stylist
 Luis Gómez Escolar - adaptation

Sources and external links
 [ Allmusic discography]
 Discogs.com discography
 Rateyourmusic.com discography

References

2004 albums
Azúcar Moreno albums